Pinus sabiniana (sometimes spelled P. sabineana), with vernacular names including towani pine, foothill pine, gray pine, bull pine, and digger pine, is a pine endemic to California in the United States. Some sources discourage using the name "digger pine," considering it pejorative  ("digger" was a slur commonly used to refer to Indigenous Americans in the Great Basin and California).

Description 
The seed cones are large and heavy,  in length and almost as wide as they are long.<ref
The male cones grow at the base of shoots on the lower branches.<ref
name="usdaTreat"></ref>

Distribution and habitat 

It is found throughout the Sierra Nevada and Coast Ranges foothills that ring the Central, San Joaquin and interior valleys; the Transverse and Peninsular Ranges; and Mojave Desert sky islands. Multiple specimens have also been found in Southern Oregon as well. It prefers rocky, well drained soil, but also grows in serpentine soil and heavy, poorly drained clay soils. It commonly occurs in association with Quercus douglasii, and "Oak/Foothill Pine vegetation" (also known as "Oak/Gray Pine vegetation") is used as a description of a type of habitat characteristic within the California chaparral and woodlands ecoregion in California, providing a sparse overstory above a canopy of the oak woodland.

Ecology and uses 
Pinus sabiniana needles are the only known food of the caterpillars of the Gelechiid moth Chionodes sabinianus.  Fossil evidence suggests that it has only recently become adapted to the Mediterranean climate as its closest relatives are part of the Madrean pine-oak woodlands found at higher elevations in the southwest US and Mexico. Some Native American groups relied heavily on sweet pine nuts for food and are thought to have contributed to the current distribution pattern, including the large gap in distribution in Tulare County. Native Americans also consumed the roots.

Special uses 
Protein and fat nutritional value of the seed are similar to Pinus pinea seeds and figured in the local indigenous diet.

Wood uses historically were determined by its particular characteristics, e.g., 0.43 mean specific gravity nearly equal to Douglas-fir (Pseudotsuga menziesii); strength properties similar to ponderosa pine; Kraft pulps high in bursting with tensile strength comparable to some northern conifer pulps; and foothill stands loggable in winter, when higher-altitude species were inaccessible. However, the high amounts of resin and compression wood, the often crooked form, heavy weight, and low stand density, made it expensive otherwise to log, transport and process. Commercial value decreased by the 1960s, to limited use for railroad ties, box "shook", pallet stock, and chips.

It may still offer potential as windbreak shelterbelt plantings.

The main turpentine constituent, heptane, an alkane hydrocarbon, at about 3 percent of needle and twig oil, is unusual in botany; the only other source in nature perhaps being the Pittosporum resiniferum known as "petroleum nut" or kerosene tree.

Taxonomy

Common name 
The name digger pine supposedly came from the observation that the Paiute foraged for its seeds by digging around the base of the tree, although it is more likely that the term was first applied to the people; "Digger Indians" was in common use in California literature from the 1800s. The historically more common name digger pine is still in widespread use. The Jepson Manual advises avoiding this name as the authors believe "digger" is pejorative in origin. It is also sometimes thought of as a pinyon pine, though it does not belong to that group.

Botanical name 

The scientific botanical name with the standard spelling sabiniana commemorates Joseph Sabine, secretary of the Horticultural Society of London. Some botanists proposed a new spelling sabineana, because they were confused with Latin grammar. The proposal has not been accepted by the relevant authorities (i.e. United States Department of Agriculture, The Jepson Manual or Germplasm Resources Information Network (GRIN). The GRIN notes that the spelling sabiniana agrees with a provision in the Vienna Code of the International Code of Botanical Nomenclature, the governing body of botanical nomenclature. In that code, recommendation 60.2C states that personal names can be Latinized in species epithets: 'Sabine' is Latinised to sabinius, with the addition of the suffix "-anus" (pertaining to) the word becomes sabiniana (In Latin, trees are feminine, irrespective if the word ends with a masculine suffix, i.e. pinus). The GRIN database notes that Sabine's last name is not correctable and therefore Pinus sabiniana is the proper name for the species.

Notes

References 
 
 A. Farjon (2005). Pines: Drawings and descriptions of the genus Pinus. Brill. 
 
 Discovery Channel (2010), MythBusters, Episode 138

Further reading

External links 
 
 
 
 USDA PLANTS Treatment for  Pinus sabiniana (California foothill pine)
 

sabiniana
Endemic flora of California
Trees of the Southwestern United States
Flora of the Sierra Nevada (United States)
Flora of the California desert regions
Natural history of the California chaparral and woodlands
Garden plants of North America
Ornamental trees
Drought-tolerant trees
Butterfly food plants
Edible nuts and seeds